Aslaug Vaa (25 August 1889 – 28 November 1965) was a Norwegian poet and playwright. Her works contain elements from local tradition and landscape mixed with international influence.

Personal life
Aslaug Vaa was born on Nystog in Rauland, in Telemark county, Norway. She was the daughter of farmers Tor Aanundsson Vaa and Anne Marie Roholt, and was a sister of sculptor Dyre Vaa. She was married to Norwegian psychologist and writer Ola Raknes, and she was the mother of Magli Elster.

Literary career
Vaa graduated with examen artium from Aars og Voss skole in Kristiania in 1909, and with "anneneksamen" from the Royal Frederick University in 1911. After her first studies, she produced works as journalist and translator, including for the magazine Den 17de Mai. While spending longer periods abroad together with her husband, she studied arts at Sorbonne in Paris, and experimental theatre in Berlin.

Vaa made her literary debut in 1934 with the poetry collection Nord i leite, and she followed up with the collections Skuggen og strendan (1935), Villarkonn (1936), and På vegakanten (1939).

Her poem So rodde dei fjordan ("then they rowed the fjords") was frequently recited on radio, has been selected for several anthologies, and was made into a song with melody by Geirr Tveitt.
Vaa's poetry and writing contains elements from local tradition, landscape and language, but also international influence.

Her first play, Steinguden (1938) is treating marriage-related issues. Her second play, Tjugendagen (1947) is set in a rural society around 1850. Honningfuglen og leoparden (first staged in 1955) is inspired from African legends.

Vaa contributed articles to several newspapers and magazines, including Arbeiderbladet, Verdens Gang and Dagbladet.

Selected bibliography

Plays
 1938 Steinguden 
 1947 Tjugendagen
 1965 Honningfuglen og leoparden
 1966 Munkeklokka

Poetry
 1934 Nord i leite
 1935 Skuggen og strendan
 1936 Villarkonn
 1939 På vegakanten
 1947 Fotefár
 1954 Skjenkarsveinens visurry
 1963 Bustader

References

Other sources
Mæhle, Leif (2001) Fann eg dei stigar…» Vandringar i Aslaug Vaas dikting (Oslo: Aschehoug)

External links
 NRK - Aslaug Vaa
Dagbladet - Aslaug Vaa

1889 births
1965 deaths
People from Vinje
Nynorsk-language writers
20th-century Norwegian poets
Norwegian women poets
Norwegian women dramatists and playwrights
20th-century Norwegian dramatists and playwrights
20th-century Norwegian women writers